The discography of Japanese model-singer Kyary Pamyu Pamyu consists of five studio albums, one extended play, ten singles and six video albums. Kyary Pamyu Pamyu debuted in 2011 under Warner Music Japan sublabel Unborde, as a musician produced by Yasutaka Nakata of the electronic duo Capsule. Kyary Pamyu Pamyu's albums have been released globally, with her seeing international success in Belgium, South Korea and Taiwan.

Kyary Pamyu Pamyu released several products before her official major label debut with Warner. In 2005, she released an idol DVD at the age of 12 under her real name Kiriko Takemura. In 2010 under the name Kyary, she released two singles digitally as a part of the Avex high school musician project, highschoolsinger.jp. In 2011, Kyary Pamyu Pamyu produced an album of Studio Ghibli songs covered electronically by a variety of musicians.

Kyary Pamyu Pamyu's second album Nanda Collection (2013) debuted at number one in Japan, becoming certified Platinum by the RIAJ. All five songs released as singles from the album also became certified, with "Ninja Re Bang Bang" certified Double Platinum for legal downloads to desktop computers.

Studio albums

Extended play

Compilation albums

Produced albums

Singles

As a lead artist

As a featured artist

Promotional singles

Other appearances

Video albums

Live concerts

Music video collections

Documentaries and television programs

Music videos

Notes

References

discography
Discographies of Japanese artists
Pop music discographies
Electronic music discographies